Vernești is a commune in Buzău County, Muntenia, Romania. It is located just north-west of the county capital, Buzău, along the national road DN10, which links Buzău with Braşov. The commune is composed of eleven villages: Brădeanca, Cândești, Cârlomănești, Mierea, Nenciu, Nișcov, Săsenii Noi, Săsenii Vale, Săsenii Vechi, Vernești, Zorești.

A Bronze Age grave was discovered in Cârlomănești village.

References

Communes in Buzău County
Localities in Muntenia